Bheriharwa is a village in West Champaran district in the Indian state of Bihar.

Demographics
 India census, Bheriharwa had a population of 4908 in 950 households. Males constitute 51.36% of the population and females 48.63%. Bheriharwa has an average literacy rate of 42.9%, lower than the national average of 74%: male literacy is 66%, and female literacy is 33%. In Bheriharwa, 20.47% of the population is under 6 years of age.

References

Villages in West Champaran district